The Buzogo River is a small river of Woleu-Ntem, Gabon.

References

Rivers of Gabon